Brock James (born 22 October 1981 in Victoria, Australia) is a former Australian rugby union player who is currently an attack coach for Ospreys.

James learnt to play Rugby at Old Collegians in South Australia under the guidance of backs coach, Jo Suttell. He represented South Australia at U12, U14 and U16's and first represented Australia in 1997 as an Under 16.

James then moved to attend The Scots College in Sydney and Sydney University, where he was a resident of St. John's College. After a few good seasons in the southern hemisphere, he joined Clermont-Ferrand after Stephen Jones's departure. For his first season, he played every single game with Clermont and became top scorer of the league with 380 points. From 4 January till 28 March 2009, he scored 41 placed kicks in a row, a new record for the Top 14, the old one being Romain Teulet's 35 kicks in a row in 2004–05, and just 3 short of the World Record held by Neil Jenkins.

James has earned caps for Australia U-21 and Australia national sevens team in 2002.

James was ranked #50 in the list 'The 50 best rugby players in the world 2009' by the British newspaper 'The Independent'.

On 1 January 2016, James makes the switch for Top 14 rivals La Rochelle from the 2016–17 season.

On 26 June 2020 James joined the Ospreys as attack coach under new boss Toby Booth then moved to New Zealand in 2022 in the province of Hawke's Bay.

Honours

Clermont
European Challenge Cup winners: (2006–07)
Top 14 champions: (2009–10)

International
 Under 21 Australian selection
 Under 19 Australian selection (World Cup)
 Under 16 Australian selection (a particularly notable achievement as he was playing outside of the traditional rugby states, for Old Collegians in South Australia at the time, where his father Jesse James was also a coach. Ben Suttell was Head Coach and inspired Brock to change positions from half-back to five-eighth)

Personal
Top 14 top points scorer (3): (2006–07, 2007–08, 2008–09)

Notes and references

1981 births
Living people
ASM Clermont Auvergne players
Rugby union fly-halves
Western Force players